The 1999 Miami Dolphins season was the team's 34th campaign, and 30th in the National Football League (NFL). It was the 17th and final season for Dolphins quarterback Dan Marino. Marino suffered an injury on October 17 against the New England Patriots, with Damon Huard taking over at quarterback. The team would go 4–1 under Huard, including a 17–0 victory over the Tennessee Titans. Marino would return on November 25, against the Dallas Cowboys, throwing five interceptions in the 20–0 loss.

The Dolphins reached the midway point of the 1999 season with a 7–1 record, but in the second half of the year, the team struggled, finishing out the season 2–6, winning only one game after Marino's return. The team finished the season 9–7, beating out the Kansas City Chiefs for the AFC's last wild card spot via tiebreakers; Miami held a better record against common opponents, going 6–1 to the Chiefs' 5–3. In the Wild Card round, the Dolphins upset the no. 3 seed Seattle Seahawks 20–17. In the Divisional round, the Dolphins were humiliated by the no. 1 seed Jacksonville Jaguars, losing 7–62, the most lopsided playoff loss in the Super Bowl era.

Offseason

1999 NFL Draft

Roster

Regular season

Schedule

Note: Intra-division opponents are in bold text.

Source:

Standings

Game summaries

Week 1 at Denver Broncos

The Dolphins opened the season on the road against the defending Super Bowl champion Denver Broncos. The Broncos were without their longtime quarterback John Elway, who announced his retirement during the off-season. Brian Griese, son of former Dolphins quarterback Bob Griese, was Denver's starting quarterback, throwing a 61-yard touchdown pass to Ed McCaffrey early in the 1st quarter. Griese would play inconsistently for the rest of the game and was sacked twice, while Dan Marino was sacked zero times. In the 4th quarter, Griese fumbled the ball, with Jason Taylor recovering it and running it into the end zone for a touchdown.

Week 2 vs. Arizona Cardinals

The Dolphins' defense picked off Cardinals quarterback Jake Plummer four times during the game. Arizona only scored one touchdown during the game, a 34-yard interception return by Rob Fredrickson in the 2nd quarter.

Week 4 at Buffalo Bills

Week 5 at Indianapolis Colts

The Dolphins were trailing 31–22 in the 4th quarter before staging a furious comeback with just under 3:30 left to play, scoring 12 unanswered points in the span of nearly 3 minutes. The run started with a 43-yard field goal from Olindo Mare with 3:20 left. With 1:54 left, Miami's defense forced Peyton Manning to run out the end zone, resulting in a safety. On the ensuing drive, Dan Marino led the offense down the field, capping it off with a 2-yard pass to Oronde Gadsden for the game-winning score. The Dolphins' defense sealed the game, with Terrell Buckley intercepting a Manning pass on the Colts' final drive of the game.

Miami compiled 469 yards of offense and committed no turnovers. Marino threw for 393 yards while two players finished with over 100 yards receiving: Gadsden with 123 yards and Tony Martin with 166.

Week 6 at New England Patriots

Dan Marino's only completion of the game was on a 8-yard pass that put him over 60,000 passing yards for his career. On Marino's second pass attempt, he was hit by Lawyer Milloy, with Andy Katzenmoyer intercepting the ball and returning it 57 yards for a touchdown. On the following drive, Marino would attempt a short pass that fell short of his intended receiver. Coach Jimmy Johnson would pull Marino from the game due to a possible shoulder injury; in the week heading into the game, Marino thought he might have injured his right trapezius. Marino was replaced by Damon Huard, whose first pass was intercepted by Ty Law and returned 27 yards for a touchdown. Despite the rocky start, Huard would lead the Dolphins to a 31–30 comeback victory, throwing a 5-yard touchdown pass to fullback Stanley Pritchett with 23 seconds left in the game for the game-winning score.

Week 7 vs. Philadelphia Eagles

With Dan Marino out due to injury, Damon Huard started at quarterback for the Dolphins, his first NFL start.

Week 8 at Oakland Raiders

Damon Huard started at quarterback for the second week in a row. After having thrown a pick six in each of the previous two games, Huard committed no turnovers against Oakland.

Week 9 vs. Tennessee Titans

The Dolphins' defense shutout the Titans, picking off Steve McNair three times. This was one of only three games that Tennessee would lose during the regular season.

Week 10 at Buffalo Bills

Damon Huard struggled throughout the game, only completing 36% of his passes for 65 yards with no touchdowns and one interception. This was the only game of the season Miami would lose with Huard starting at quarterback.

Week 11 vs. New England Patriots

Miami's defense picked off Drew Bledsoe five times. This was the last game of the season Damon Huard would start at quarterback, as Dan Marino would return for the following game four days later. Miami finished 4–1 with Huard as starter.

Week 12 at Dallas Cowboys
NFL on Thanksgiving Day

Dan Marino's first game after returning from injury was a disaster. Marino threw five interceptions, one of which was returned 46 yards by Dexter Coakley in the 3rd quarter for the first score of the game. The Dolphins' defense tried to help keep the team in the game, shutting out the Cowboys' offense for three quarters. The game's only offensive score came in the 4th, with Troy Aikman throwing a 65-yard touchdown pass to Rocket Ismail.

Week 13 vs. Indianapolis Colts

The Dolphins trailed 24–10 at halftime, but tied the game twice in the 4th quarter, including a 32-yard field goal from Olindo Mare with 0:36 left in regulation. However, Indianapolis kicker Mike Vanderjagt made a 53-yard field goal as time expired to give the Colts a 37–34 victory.

Week 14 at New York Jets

The Dolphins had a 13–6 lead at the start of the 4th quarter, but the team collapsed in the final quarter of play. The Jets scored 22 unanswered points in the 4th quarter, including a 67-yard interception return by Omar Stoutmire.

Week 15 vs. San Diego Chargers

Neither team managed to a score a touchdown during the game. The Dolphins' defense held the Chargers to 186 yards of total offense and forced one turnover. This was the last regular season game Dan Marino would win in his career.

Week 16 vs. New York Jets

Week 17 at Washington Redskins

Dan Marino started at quarterback, but was pulled from the game and replaced by Damon Huard; Marino finished 11-of-24 for 118 yards with one interception. Despite the loss, the Dolphins still qualified for the playoffs as the Chiefs lost earlier in the day to the Raiders.

Playoffs

AFC wild card game: at (3) Seattle Seahawks

The Seattle Seahawks played host to their first playoff game since the 1984 season. The Seahawks were dominated by the Dolphins defense, who held them to only 171 yards, with just 32 in the second half, and sacked Seahawks quarterback Jon Kitna six times, three by Trace Armstrong. Although Seattle jumped out to a 17–10 lead in the 3rd quarter, the Dolphins would rally back behind quarterback Dan Marino, who threw for 196 yards and a touchdown, leading his team to their first road playoff win since 1972 in what ultimately proved to be the final game played at The Kingdome (the Seahawks moved into Husky Stadium for the 2000 season) and the final win of Marino's career.

The Dolphins were the only away team to win in the Wild Card round.

AFC Divisional Playoff Game: at (1) Jacksonville Jaguars

The Jacksonville Jaguars shredded their in-state rivals the Dolphins with 520 total offensive yards in what became Miami quarterback Dan Marino's last game in the NFL and the most lopsided postseason contest since the Chicago Bears defeated the Redskins 73–0 in the 1940 NFL championship game. Their defense forced seven turnovers and held the Dolphins to 131 total yards. Marino was held to just 11 of 25 completions for 95 yards and 1 touchdown, with 2 interceptions and a fumble that was returned for a touchdown in his final game. Marino retired shortly after the season ended.

This was also Jimmy Johnson's final game as an NFL head coach; Johnson resigned the day after the game.

Notes and references

Miami
Miami Dolphins seasons
Miami Dolphins